Sheykh Obeyd was a stud farm that raised Arabian horses, located near Cairo, Egypt.  It was founded by Wilfred Blunt and Lady Anne Blunt in the late 19th century, and was the home of Lady Anne following her permanent separation from Wilfred in 1906, over his ill-treatment and blatant affairs, until her death.  The foundation bloodstock for Sheykh Obeyd came primarily from the breeding program of Ali Pasha Sherif, and the best animals were sent on to the Blunts' Crabbet Arabian Stud in England.

References
Wentworth, Judith Anne Dorothea Blunt-Lytton. The Authentic Arabian Horse, 3rd ed. George Allen & Unwin Ltd., 1979.

Longford, Elizabeth.  A Pilgrimage of Passion: The Life of Eilfred Scawen Blunt, Alfred A Knopf, 1980.

Winstone, H. V. F. Lady Anne Blunt: A Biography, Barzan Publishing, 2003.

Horse farms
Farms in Egypt
Arabian breeders and trainers